Sleeping Giant, also known as Nounou Mountain, is a mountain ridge located west of the towns Wailua and Kapaa in the Nounou Forest Reserve on the Hawaiian island of Kauai. The formation received its common English name both from its resemblance to a reclining human figure, and from a Native Hawaiian legend about a giant who, after great labor or overeating, lay to rest and is yet to awaken. Today Sleeping Giant is a major landmark for tourists visiting Kauai. Hiking trails lead to the highest point of the ridge, or what resembles a forehead.

References

Landforms of Kauai
Mountains of Hawaii
Tourist attractions in Kauai County, Hawaii